Neurophotonics is a quarterly, peer-reviewed scientific journal covering optical technology applicable to study of the brain and their impact on basic and clinical neuroscience applications, published by SPIE. The editor-in-chief is Anna Devor (Boston University, USA).

Abstracting and indexing
The journal is abstracted and indexed in:
 PubMed
 PubMed Central
 Science Citation Index Expanded
 Inspec
 Scopus
 Embase
 Ei/Compendex
According to the Journal Citation Reports, the journal has a 2020 impact factor of 3.593.

References

External links
 

Optics journals
SPIE academic journals
English-language journals
Publications established in 2014